The 1963 European Amateur Boxing Championships  were held in Moscow, Soviet Union from 26 May to 2 June. The 15th edition of the bi-annual competition was organised by the European governing body for amateur boxing, EABA. There were 133 fighters from 18 countries participating.

Medal winners

Medal table

External links
Results
Amateur Boxing

European Amateur Boxing Championships
Boxing
European Amateur Boxing Championships
Boxing
Sports competitions in Moscow
1963 in Russia
May 1963 sports events in Europe
June 1963 sports events in Europe